Ian Scott Hastie (1887 – after 1911) was an English professional footballer born in London who played in the Football League for Birmingham. Hastie joined Birmingham from junior football in north London in May 1911, and made his debut on 18 November 1911, standing in for regular outside right Charlie Millington in a 2–0 defeat away at Clapton Orient. This was the only first-team game that Hastie, a good dribbler but lacking awareness of the game as a whole, played for the club before leaving for Wycombe Wanderers at the end of the 1911–12 season.

References

1887 births
Year of death missing
Footballers from Greater London
English footballers
Association football wingers
Birmingham City F.C. players
Wycombe Wanderers F.C. players
English Football League players
Date of birth missing
Place of death missing